Jay Grant Richardson (born 14 November 1979) is an English former professional footballer who played in the Football League as a midfielder.

References

Sources

Jay Richardson, Neil Brown

1979 births
Living people
English footballers
Association football midfielders
People from Kenton, London
Footballers from the London Borough of Brent
Chelsea F.C. players
Exeter City F.C. players
Enfield F.C. players
Crawley Town F.C. players
Eastbourne Borough F.C. players
Croydon Athletic F.C. players
English Football League players